Barbara Leigh-Hunt (born 14 December 1935) is an English actress. Her numerous theatre credits include Broadway productions of Hamlet (1958) and Sherlock Holmes Justice (1973) (1974), and she won the 1993 Olivier Award for Best Supporting Actress for the National Theatre production of An Inspector Calls. Her film appearances include Frenzy (1972), Henry VIII and His Six Wives (1972), Bequest to the Nation (1973) and Billy Elliot (2000).

Early life
Leigh-Hunt was born in Bath, Somerset.

Career
On stage, Leigh-Hunt has appeared in many productions as well those with the Bristol Old Vic, the Royal Shakespeare Company and the Royal National Theatre. Her early film roles have included Catherine Parr in Henry VIII and His Six Wives (1972), Bequest to the Nation (1973) and Oh Heavenly Dog (1980). Her most famous movie role is probably in Alfred Hitchcock's penultimate film Frenzy (1972), as a woman raped and strangled by a serial killer, that included the first graphically violent scene featuring visible nudity of Hitchcock's career.

In 1983 Leigh-Hunt appeared as the Queen of Bavaria in the mini-series Wagner, sharing her scenes with Ralph Richardson, Laurence Olivier and John Gielgud as court ministers. Richard Burton played the composer Richard Wagner. Her husband, Richard Pasco, whom she married in 1967, appeared also.

Leigh-Hunt played Jean Lawrence in the controversial BBC drama Tumbledown (1988), and Lady Catherine de Bourgh in Pride and Prejudice (1995), and provided the voices of the farmer's wife in The Plague Dogs (1982), and Captain Mildred and Mary the Hover Fairy in the 1987 Children's BBC series Charlie Chalk. In 1999, Leigh starred as Lady Cumnor in BBC's four-part series adaptation of the novel Wives and Daughters (1999). More recently she has appeared in such films as Paper Mask (1990), Keep the Aspidistra Flying (1997), Billy Elliot (2000), The Martins (2001) and Vanity Fair (2004), and has had much work on television, mainly in guest character parts.

Personal life
Her cousin was the actor Ronald Leigh-Hunt.

Filmography

References

External links 

Selected performances in Theatre Archive University of Bristol

1935 births
English film actresses
English radio actresses
English stage actresses
English television actresses
Laurence Olivier Award winners
Living people
People from Bath, Somerset
Royal Shakespeare Company members
British Shakespearean actresses